Long Phước is a common place name in Vietnam. It is the same two chu Han characters reversed as another common place name Phước Long 

In English texts it usually refers to xã Long Phước, Bà Rịa-Vũng Tàu, a village destroyed by the Australian Army in 1966.

Other meanings are:
 phường :vi:Long Phước, Quận 9, in District 9, Ho Chi Minh City
 phường :vi:Long Phước, Phước Long, in :vi:Phước Long (thị xã), of Bình Phước province
 xã :vi:Long Phước, Bến Cầu, in Bến Cầu District, Tây Ninh Province
 xã :vi:Long Phước, Long Thành, in Long Thành District, Đồng Nai Province
 xã :vi:Long Phước, Long Hồ, in Long Hồ District,  Vĩnh Long Province